Preis der Stadt Wien für Geisteswissenschaften or Prize of the City of Vienna for the Humanities is a prize awarded by the city of Vienna, Austria, awarded annually since 1947 for outstanding contributions in the humanities. It is worth 10,000 Euros to the winner.

Award winners
The following have won the award:

 1947: Leopold Wenger
 1948: Richard Pittioni
 1949: Friedrich Heer
 1950: Charles A. Gulick
 1951: Heinrich Klang
 1952: Otto Rommel
 1953: Eduard Castle
 1954: Robert Reininger
 1955: Viktor Kraft
 1956: Fritz Novotny
 1957: Heinrich Benedikt
 1958: Kurt Donin
 1959: Etta Becker-Donner
 1960: Wilhelm Havers
 1961: Karl Bühler
 1962: Josef Keil
 1963: Rudolf Egger
 1964: Michael Pfliegler
 1965: Hugo Hantsch, Karl Popper
 1966: Otto Erich Deutsch
 1967: Alfred Verdroß-Droßberg
 1968: Adolf Merkl
 1969: Edmund Hlawka
 1970: Albin Lesky
 1971: Wilhelm Mrazek
 1972: Friedrich Nowakowski
 1973: Eduard März
 1974: Heinz Politzer
 1975: Robert A. Kann
 1976: Renate Wagner-Rieger
 1977: Hermann Vetters
 1978: Stephan Verosta
 1979: Herbert Hunger
 1980: Kurt Rothschild
 1981: Eva Frodl-Kraft
 1982: Karl Stadler
 1983: Eduard Sekler
 1984: Adam Wandruszka
 1985: Wilhelm Weber
 1986: Ernst Gombrich
 1987: Erich Heintel
 1988: Fritz Schwind
 1989: Walter Kraus
 1990: Heinrich Appelt
 1991: Erich Zöllner
 1992: Werner Hofmann
 1993: Marie Albu-Jahoda
 1994: Erika Weinzierl
 1995: Adolf Holl
 1996: Michael Mitterauer
 1997: Wendelin Schmidt-Dengler
 1998: Leopold Rosenmayr
 1999: Norbert Leser
 2000: Erich Streissler
 2001: Ruth Wodak
 2002: Helmut Konrad
 2003: Manfried Welan
 2004: Gerald Stourzh
 2005: Anton Pelinka
 2006: Christiane Spiel
 2007: Manfred Wagner
 2008: Helga Nowotny
 2009: Herta Nagl
 2010: Alfred Springer
 2011: Ingrid Cella
 2012: Oliver Rathkolb
 2013: Herbert Hausmaninger
 2014: Konrad Paul Liessmann
 2015: Andre Gingrich
 2016: Wolfgang Lutz
 2017: Herlinde Pauer-Studer
 2018: Manfred Nowak
 2019: Verena Winiwarter
 2020: Gabriella Hauch
 2021: Clemens Jabloner

References

External links
Preisträgerinnen und Preisträger – Preise der Stadt Wien: Geisteswissenschaft (seit 1947)

1947 establishments in Austria
Awards established in 1947
Humanities awards
Austrian awards
Culture in Vienna
Vienna-related lists
Municipal awards